Irattai Tirupati Temple refers to two temples of the Nava Tirupati, namely Devapiran temple and Aravindalochanar temple dedicated to Vishnu located in Tiruchendur-Tirunelveli route, Tamil Nadu, India in the banks of Thamiraparani river. All these 9 temples are classified as "Divya Desams", the 108 temples of Vishnu revered by the 12 poet saints Alvars. The two temples are  located adjacent to each other. All these 9 temples of the Nava Tirupati are also classified as "Divya Desams", the 108 temples of Vishnu revered by the 12 poet-saints called the Alvars. The Irattai Tirupati is a Ketu Sthalam, sacred to the deity Ketu. Constructed in the Dravidian style of architecture, the temples are dedicated to Vishnu who is worshipped as Devapiran and Aravindalochanar and Lakshmi as Varagunavalli and Karuthadankanni.

A granite wall surrounds both the temples, enclosing all their shrines. The rajagopuram, the temple's gateway tower has a flat structure. The temples follows Tenkalai tradition of worship. Six daily rituals and three yearly festivals are held at the temples, of which the ten-day annual Vaikuntha Ekadashi during the Tamil month of Margali (December - January) and the Nammalvar birth celebrations with Garudasevai with all nine temple of Nava Tirupati, being the most prominent. The temple is maintained and administered by the Hindu Religious and Endowment Board of the Government of Tamil Nadu.

Legend

As per the regional legend, the place finds mention in Brahmanda Purana and Padma Purana where it is called Kedara Nilaya. Once, a sage named Suprabha wanted to perform a penance and in his search for land, he ploughed at this place. He found a balance (tola) and a bow (vil), which, when he lifted, turned into a couple. The couple had been cursed by Kubera once for insulting him. Since the bow and balance were redeemed to their original form, the place is called Tolavillimangalam. The sage Suprabha continued to perform penance, at the end of which, the devas received the share of offering (Havibhaga). Vishnu was pleased by the devotion of the sage and since he appeared with devas, he came to be known as Devapiran. The sage continued to perform penance at this temple and while walking down the river with lotus pond, he found Vishnu following him. At the request of the sage, Vishnu resided in this place as Aravindalochanar (the one who appeared from lotuses). As per another legend, the Ashvins wanted the share of the offerings made by men. They prayed to Brahma who redirected them to pray at this place. The twins came to the place and performed penance at this place. They had a dip in the tank, which came to be known as Ashvini Tirtha. Vishnu appeared to them bearing lotus flowers in his had and granted their wishes.

Architecture
It is understood from the inscriptions from the temples that they have been a part of a series of temples built by Pandyas and expanded by Madurai Nayaks. The rajagopuram, the temple's gateway tower, is a flat structure, unlike other South Indian temples, which have a conical elevated structure. A granite wall surrounds the temple, enclosing all its shrines and halls. The sanctum of each of the temples houses the images of Devapiran and Aravindalocha facing east. The images are made of shaligrama stone. The hall preceding the sanctum, the Artha Mandapam houses the festival image of presiding deities along with the images of Sridevi and Bhudevi on either of his sides. The Mahamandapa has shrines for Senai Mudaliyar, Garuda, Venugopala, Manavala Mamunigal, and the Alvars.

Festivals and religious importance
The Garuda Sevai utsavam(festival) in the month of Vaikasi (May-Jun) witnesses 9 Garudasevai, a spectacular event in which festival image idols from the Nava Tirupatis shrines in the area are brought on Garuda vahana (sacred vehicle). An idol of Nammalvar is also brought here on an Anna Vahanam (palanquin) and his pasurams (hymns) dedicated to each of these 9 temples are recited. The utsavar (festival deity) of Nammalvar is taken in a palanquin to each of the 9 temples, through the paddy fields in the area. The pasurams (hymns) dedicated to each of the 9 Divya Desams are chanted in the respective shrines. This is the most important of the festivals in this area, and it draws thousands of visitors. 

The temples follow the traditions of the Thenkalai sect of Vaishnavite tradition and follows Pancharathra aagama. The temple priests perform the pooja (rituals) during festivals and on a daily basis. As at other Vishnu temples of Tamil Nadu, the priests belong to the Vaishnava community, from the Brahmin class. The temple rituals are performed six times a day: Kalasanthi at 8:00 a.m., Uchikalam at 12:00 p.m., Sayarakshai at 6:00 p.m., and Ardha Jamam at 8:00 p.m. Each ritual has three steps: alangaram (decoration), neivethanam (food offering) and deepa aradanai (waving of lamps) for both Aravindalochanar and Devapiran. During the last step of worship, nadasvaram (pipe instrument) and tavil (percussion instrument) are played, religious instructions in the Vedas (sacred text) are recited by priests, and worshippers prostrate themselves in front of the temple mast. There are weekly, monthly, and fortnightly rituals performed in the temple.

Religious significance

The Brahmanda Purana, one of the eighteen sacred texts of Hinduism, written by Veda Vyasa, contains a chapter called Nava Tirupati Mahatmeeyam.  Vaikuntha Mahatmeeyam is another work in Sanskrit that glorifies the temple and is a part of Tamraparani Sthalapurana available only in palm manuscripts. The temple is revered in Nalayira Divya Prabandham, the 7th–9th century Vaishnava canon, by Nammalvar. The temple is classified as a Divyadesam, one of the 108 Vishnu temples that are mentioned in the book. The temple is also classified as a Nava Tirupati, the nine temples revered by Nammalvar located in the banks of Tamiraparani river. The temple is next only to Alwarthirunagari Temple in terms of importance among the nine Nava Tirupati temple. Nammalvar makes a reference about the temple in his works in his Tiruvaymoli. During the 18th and 19th centuries, the temple finds mention in several works like 108 Tirupati Antati by Divya Kavi Pillai Perumal Aiyangar. The temple also forms a series of Navagraha temples where each of the nine planetary deities of one of the temples of Nava Tirupati. There are two temples, one a north temple and other a south temple.  Both the temples have two prakarams (closed precincts of a temple).  It is referred to as Ketu sthalam, a location for the lunar deity, Ketu.

References

External links

 
Hindu temples in Thoothukudi district